Rising Sun Pictures (RSP) is an Australian visual effects company headquartered in Adelaide, South Australia, co-founded and headed by Tony Clark. Since April 2021 it has been owned by FuseFX. Its film and television credits include Black Widow, Ford v Ferrari, Spider-Man: Far from Home, Game of Thrones, and Thor: Ragnarok.

History
The company was founded in 1995 by Tony Clark, Wayne Lewis, and Gail Fuller in Adelaide. It is named after the Rising Sun Inn in the Adelaide suburb of Kensington, where they held their first meeting.

In 2015 RSP formed a partnership with the University of South Australia whereby nine Bachelor of Media Arts students would work at RSP as part of their degree. This collaboration continues as of 2022, with graduates in high demand and several subsequently employed at RSP.

In 2016, the company launched a production office in Sydney, located at Fox Studios Australia. This is intended to support both local Australian filmmakers (many of whom are based nearby and use Fox for shooting, editorial and other production and post-production work) as well as its ongoing work with international clients. Having a base in Sydney would allow RSP to become involved at an earlier stage of production.

During the COVID-19 pandemic, Australia's relative insulation from the worst effects allowed film and television production to continue in near-normal conditions, including the production of Mortal Kombat in Adelaide. In March 2021 RSP expanded its offices and studios. In mid-2021, it opened a small production studio in Southbank precinct of Brisbane, Queensland.

In April 2021, Los Angeles-based FuseFX acquired Rising Sun Pictures. No operational changes were planned at the company, which would continue to maintain its brand, but the acquisition would allow it to expand further.

Rising Sun has worked with the Australian Institute for Machine Learning, enabling it to develop some cutting-edge new tools.

Description and people
RSP's offices are in Pulteney Street, Adelaide city centre.

 Tony Clark, a driving force behind the outfit, continues to lead the studio and operate under the Rising Sun Pictures brand. Meredith Meyer-Nichols is head of production and executive producer, and in 2021 there were around 270 staff employed in Adelaide.

Awards
The company has won many awards, including AEAF Special Merit Awards for Mortal Kombat  and series 2 of The Boys in 2021.

ARIA Music Awards
The ARIA Music Awards is an annual awards ceremony that recognises excellence, innovation, and achievement across all genres of Australian music. They commenced in 1987. 

! 
|-
| ARIA Music Awards of 2003
| Rising Sun Pictures for Rogue Traders' "One of My Kind"
| Best Video
| 
|  
|-

Film and TV credits
RSP's film and television credits include Black Widow, Ford v Ferrari, Spider-Man: Far from Home, Game of Thrones, and Thor: Ragnarok.

Other credits include:

Involvement in open source projects
Projects sponsored by Rising Sun Pictures include:
Earth - a utility for finding files across a large network of machines and track disk usage in real time
pyshake - integrates Python with Shake
Affogato - a plugin for Avid's Softimage XSI 3D animation software
Sun Grid Engine - added Array Job Interdependencies

See also

Cospective, software company that started as Rising Sun Research
List of film production companies
List of television production companies

References

External links
 

Companies based in Adelaide
Companies established in 1995
Visual effects companies
Film production companies of Australia